This is a list of the heads of state of the Bahamas, from the independence of The Bahamas in 1973 to the present day.

From 1973 the head of state under the Bahamas Independence Act 1973 is the Monarch of the Bahamas, currently King Charles III, who is also the Monarch of the United Kingdom and the other Commonwealth realms. The King is represented in the Bahamas by a Governor-General.

Monarch (1973–present)
The succession to the throne is the same as the succession to the British throne.

Governor-General
The Governor-General is the representative of the Monarch in the Bahamas and exercises most of the powers of the Monarch. The Governor-General is appointed for an indefinite term, serving at the pleasure of the Monarch. After the passage of the Statute of Westminster 1931, the Governor-General is appointed solely on the advice of the Cabinet of the Bahamas without the involvement of the British government. In the event of a vacancy the Chief Justice served as Officer Administering the Government.

Symbols
 Died in office.

Standards

References

External links
 World Statesmen – The Bahamas
 Rulers.org – The Bahamas

Government of the Bahamas
H
Bahamas